The Nemegt Basin is a geographical area in the northwestern Gobi Desert, in Ömnögovi Province, southern Mongolia. It is known locally as the "Valley of the Dragons", since it is a source of many fossil finds, including dinosaurs, dinosaur eggs, and trace fossils.

Geology 
The main geological formations in the area are the Nemegt Formation, Barun Goyot Formation, and Djadochta Formation, in order of age, from youngest (most superficial) to oldest (deepest).

References

Depressions of Mongolia
Gobi Desert
Basins of Asia